The Republic of Poland Ambassador to Greece is official representative of the President and Government of Poland to the President and Government of Greece. Poland Ambassador to Greece is also head of the Poland's diplomatic mission in Greece.

Diplomatic relations between Poland and Greece were established on 13 March 1919.

Embassy of Poland in Greece is located in Athens, additionally there are Honorary Consulates located in Thessaloniki, Piraeus, Heraklion and Rhodes.

List of ambassadors of Poland to Greece 

 1919–1921 – August Zaleski (envoy)
 1921–1924 – Mikołaj Jurystowski (envoy)
 1924–1926 – Czesław Andrycz (chargé d’affaires)
 1926–1934 – Paweł Juriewicz (envoy)
 1934–1936 – Zygmunt Wierski (chargé d’affaires)
 1936–1942 – Władysław Günther-Schwarzburg (envoy)
 1942–1943 – Roger Adam Raczyński (envoy)
 1943–1945 – Paweł Czerwiński (chargé d’affaires)
 1945 – Roger Adam Raczyński (envoy)
 1956–1960 – Aleksander Małecki (envoy)
 1960–1966 – Zygmunt Dworakowski
 1966–1970 – Henryk Golański
 1972–1975 – Stanisław Dobrowolski
 1975–1979 – Jan Bisztyga
 1979–1984 – Janusz Lewandowski
 1984–1989 – Józef Tejchma
 1989–1992 – Janusz Lewandowski
 1992–1997 – Ryszard Żółtaniecki
 1997–2001 – Wojciech Lamentowicz
 2001–2005 – Grzegorz Dziemidowicz
 2005–2006 – Maciej Górski
 2006–2007 – Maciej Lang (chargé d’affaires)
 2007–2012 – Michał Klinger
 2012–2014 – Maciej Krych
 2015–2019 – Anna Barbarzak
 od 2020 – Artur Lompart

References 

Greece
Poland